Shri Uttaradi Math  (IAST:Śrī Uttarādi Maṭha) (also known as Uttaradi Peetha), is one of the main monasteries (matha) founded by Madhvacharya with Padmanabha Tirtha as its head to preserve and propagate Dvaita Vedanta (Tattvavada) outside Tulunadu region. Uttaradi Math is one of the three premier Dvaita monasteries or Mathatraya that descended from Madhvacharya in the lineage of Padmanabha Tirtha through Jayatirtha. After Jayatirtha and Vidyadhiraja Tirtha, Uttaradi Math continued in the lineage of Kavindra Tirtha (a disciple of Vidyadhiraja Tirtha) and later in the lineage of Vidyanidhi Tirtha (a disciple of Ramachandra Tirtha). The Moola Rama and Moola Sita idols worshipped in the Uttaradi Matha have a long history and are revered for their great divinity.

Uttaradi Math is an important institution among the Madhvas and also deeply respected among the Vaishnavas and the other Hindus. Most of the Deshastha Madhvas and majority of Madhvas outside Tulu Nadu region are followers of this matha. Uttaradi Math has followers across Karnataka , Maharashtra, Andhra Pradesh, Telangana, Madhya Pradesh, Tamil Nadu and Bihar (especially Gaya) regions.

The Uttaradi Math is one of the major Hindu monastic institutions that has historically coordinated monastic activities through satellite institutions in India, preserved Sanskrit literature and pursued Dvaita studies. The Uttaradi Math has been a library and a source of historic Sanskrit manuscripts. Along with other Hindu monasteries Sri matha has been active in preserving the Vedas, sponsoring students and recitals, Sanskrit scholarship, and celebrating the annual Madhva Jayanthi. The current peetadhipathi or the acharya holding the pontifical seat is Śrī Satyātma Tīrtha Mahaswāmiji, the 42nd Jagadguru in the spiritual succession of pontiffs of this matha.

Etymology
According to tradition, "Uttarādi" (Sanskrit: उत्तरादि) refers to "Lord Vishnu who lifts us from the cycle of Saṃsāra" and "Matha" (Sanskrit: मठ) refers to "cloister, institute" or temple for spiritual studies. It is the 494th name of Lord Vishnu in Vishnu Sahasranama.

Historian C. Hayavadana Rao says, "The Uttarādi Mutt ( i.e., the original North Mutt because it was first presided over by men drawn from the North or Uttara Desa ) is the prime pontifical seat of Madhvācharya". Author H. Chittaranjan says, "Saint Padmanabha Tirtha was given Deeksha by Madhvacharya himself to spread the Dwaita school of thought in northern Karnataka region. Since the Swamiji spread the Dwaita philosophy in the northern parts of Karnataka, the Mutt established there gained the name Uttaradi Mutt". Sharma opines that, "The Uttaradi Mutt has a territorial designation as its Pontificate has been occupied by Uttara-Karnatakas or Uttaradi-Karnatakas". So, this matha was also earlier known as "Padmanabha Tirtha Matha". As per traditional accounts, Uttaradi Matha was the main matha that descended from Madhvacharya through Padmanabha Tirtha, Narahari Tirtha, Madhava Tirtha, Akshobya Tirtha, Jayatirtha, Vidyadhiraja Tirtha, and Kavindra Tirtha, hence this matha is also known as "Adi Matha" or "Moola Matha" or "Moola Samsthana" or "Moola Maha Samsthana of Sri Madhvacharya". Uttaradi Matha was also once used to be called "Sri Satyabodha Swamy Matha" after its famous peetadipathi and saint Sri Satyabodha Tirtha of Savanur.

History

During the time's of Satyaprajna Tirtha there was a continuous conflict between the followers of Dvaita and Advaita Vedantas. According to Manimanjari and Madhva Vijaya, Ananda Tirtha was born as an incarnation of Vayu (the Wind God) to give correct interpretation of Vedanta and challenge the doctrine of Shankara, who taught Advaita Vedanta in which the individual souls or jivas were considered same as Brahman. Some Shankara's followers who were egoistic, destroyed the monasteries of their opponents and indulged in a sinful acts. The teacher Satyaprajna Tirtha was also killed, his disciple and successor Prajna Tirtha was converted to faith of Advaita by force. However, the disciples of Satya-prajna Tirtha and Prajna Tirtha remained secretly attached to true Vedanta and continued to practice their doctrine secretly. Achyuta Preksha Tirtha, the teacher of Madhvacharya was of this line.

According to tradition, it was said that at the time of Sri Achyuta Preksha who was the pontiff of Adi matha, on the ordain of Veda Vyasa, Lord Vayu incarnated in this world as Sri Madhvacharya on the day of Vijaya Dashami in 1238 AD for the purpose of consolidating  Hindu dharma. Uttaradi Matha was descended from Madhva through Padmanabha Tirtha, Jayatirtha and his disciples. The Uttaradi Matha does not have any headquarters as such, though sometimes some places have received special attention. It is mainly an itinerant institution moving and camping from place to place, busy carrying the torch of spiritual learning where ever it goes.

Spread of Dvaita
Padmanabha Tirtha and his descendants are responsible for the spread of Dvaita Vedanta outside Tulu Nadu region. Sharma says Narahari Tirtha is considered to be the forerunner of the Vaishnava devotional movement of the Dasakuta of Haridasa movement in Kannada. The doctrine of Tattvavada was further carried on and was spread all over the country by Jayatirtha and his descendants.

In the first quarter of the 17th century, Vidyadhisha Tirtha (16th pontiff of Uttaradi Matha) was able to gain some converts to the Madhva fold, in Bihar, from among the Brahmins of Gaya, who still profess allegiance to Madhva school. Sri Satyanatha Tirtha during his time as the peetadhipathi of Uttarādi mutt visited Gaya and strengthened the hold of the mutt among Gayapalas, who had been converted to Madhvism by his predecessor Vidyadhisha Tirtha.

Idols worshipped
 
The Moola Rama and Moola Sita idols worshipped in Uttaradi Matha are "Chaturyuga Murthy's"  (the idols has been in worship since Four Yugas). Madhvacharya secured these from Gajapati kings and passed them on to his disciple Padmanabha Tirtha. Along with these the idol of Digvijaya Rama, which Madhvacharya got sculpted for himself, Vamsha Rama idol obtained by Madhava Tirtha and Prasanna Vittala idol obtained by Akshobya Tirtha are also worshipped in the matha. Madhvacharya was presented with 8 Vyasamushtis by Vedavyasa during his return from Badrikashrama. 5 Vyasamushtis out of the 8 Vyasamushtis are in Uttaradi Matha. Quoting about these Vyasamushtis, German Indologist Helmuth von Glasenapp says, "One is at Udupi, One is at Subrahmanyam Mutt, One at Madyatala (Sode Mutt) and the remaining five in the Acharya's Mutt (Uttaradi Mutt)". Purandara Dasa glorified the Moola Rama and Moola Sita idols, the 5 Vyasamushtis and other 28 idols worshipped in Uttaradi Matha in one of his songs  "Madhvarayara Devatarcaneya Prasiddha Raghunatharu Poojisuva Sobagu". Sanskrit Scholar V. R. Panchamukhi says, "Sri Sri Satyatmatirtha always worships the auspicious Mula Rama, the Lord of Goddess Lakshmi, always accompanied by Goddess Sīta".

Bifurcation of mathas
Madhvacharya initiated Padmanabha Tirtha as his successor to the main matha and instructed to spread Tattvavada (Dvaita) outside Tulunadu region, especially in the North Karnataka and Maharashtra regions since Padmanabha Tirtha was from Puntamba (now in Maharashtra). After Padmanabha Tirtha, Narahari Tirtha coninued as the peetadhipathi of the matha and continued to spread Tattvavada in Andhra Pradesh and Telangana. After him Madhava Tirtha, Akshobya Tirtha, Jayatirtha and Vidyadhiraja Tirtha occupied the throne of the main matha. As per the traditional accounts, this main matha was divided twice, so we end up with three mathas. They are Uttaradi Math, Vyasaraja Math and Raghavendra Math. Out of these three mathas, Uttaradi Math is the largest.

 First bifurcation
During the times of Vidyadhiraja Tirtha (successor of Jayatirtha) the first bifurcation of the main matha took place. Main Matha continued in the lineage of Kavindra Tirtha (a disciple of Vidyadhiraja Tirtha) as Uttaradi Matha to spread Tattvavada (Dvaita) in the Northern part of Karnataka and beyond. At the same time, Rajendra Tirtha (a disciple of Vidyadhiraja Tirtha) established "Poorvadi Matha", which is now known by the name of Vyasaraja Math to spread Tattvavada (Dvaita) in the Southern parts of Karnataka and beyond until Tamil Nadu.   

 Second bifurcation
The second bifurcation of the main matha took place during the times of Ramachandra Tirtha. Initially, ashrama was given to Vibudendra Tirtha by Ramachandra Tirtha, and even named as his successor. It is not known what happened but Vibudendra Tirtha couldn't return from the pilgrimage tour during Ramachandra Tirtha's last phase of life. So Ramachandra Tirtha chose to initiate another pontiff and named him "Vidyanidhi Tirtha" and declared him as his successor. Vibudendra Tirtha returned from the pilgrimage tour after the death of Ramachandra Tirtha. Hence two mathas were established. Uttaradi Matha continued in the lineage of Vidyanidhi Tirtha and the other matha was formed by Vibudendra Tirtha. It was known as "Dakshinadi Matha" or "Kumbakona Matha (which is now known by the name of Raghavendra Matha). These lineages were formed and continued for the benefit of the Madhva philosophy so that more and more individuals consequently have access to the philosophy and get Upadeśa (spiritual guidance).

According to Surendranath Dasgupta, Uttaradi Math was divided twice, and so we end up with three mathas, the other two being Vyasaraja Math and Raghavendra Math.

Uttaradi Math, along with Vyasaraja Math and Raghavendra Math, is considered to be the three premier apostolic institutions of Dvaita Vedanta and are jointly referred as Mathatraya. It is the pontiffs and pandits of the Mathatraya that have been the principal architects of post-Madhva Dvaita Vedanta through the centuries. Among the mathas outside of Tulu Nadu region, Uttaradi Matha is the largest.

Pontifical lineage

Origin

As per authoritative Hindu scriptures, "The Supreme God also wanted to bless the souls with divine knowledge, by which they can attain salvation. For this purpose, the Supreme God — Śrī Nārāyana Himself incarnated as Śrī Hamsa and adorned the pontifical seat called the Hamsa-Pīṭha."

Indian anthropologists Surajit Sinha and Baidyanath Saraswati says that:

List of Pontiffs

The complete list of pontiffs (Peethādhipathis / ācāryas) who had taken the seat of this math is as below:
This list represents the authorized guru-paramparā (disciplic succession) of Śrī Uttaradi Math till date.

 Śrī Haṁsa (A name of The Supreme Person/Supreme Godhead, Śrī Nārāyaṇa or Śrī Hari; Paramātmā)
 Śrī Brahmā' Śrī Sanakādi
 Śrī Dūrvāsā
 Śrī Jñāna-nidhi Tīrtha
 Śrī Garuḍa-vāhana Tīrtha
 Śrī Kaivalya Tīrtha
 Śrī Jñāneśa Tīrtha
 Śrī Para Tīrtha
 Śrī Satya-prajña Tīrtha
 Śrī Prājña Tīrtha
 Śrī Acyuta-prekṣa Tīrtha or Acyuta-Prājña Tīrtha

Hagiology

The "Gurucarya" is a hagiological work on the Pontiffs of the Uttaradi Mutt (from Madhvacharya down to Satyanidhi Tirtha). These floating traditions of the Mutt came to be defined and recorded during the days of Sripadaraja. "Guruvamsakathakalpataru" is another hagiological work on the lives of all Madhva Pontiffs of Uttarādi Matha order up to Satyasandha Tirtha, authored by Bhimadaivajna of Bijapur.

Followers
Authors Surajit Sinha and Baidyanath Saraswati says, "An overwhelming majority of Madhvas, widely scattered all over India owes its allegiance to the Uttaradi Matha". Most of the Deshastha Madhvas of Maharashtra, Madhya Pradesh and South India, and the whole Gayawal Brahmin community of Bihar are followers of this Matha. In Karnataka, Majority of Madhvas in the districts of Bijapur, Belgaum, Dharwad, Kalaburagi (Gulbarga), Gadag, Raichur, Bagalkote, Haveri, Shivamogga, Bidar, Vijayanagara, Hassan, Chikmagalur and Mysore are followers of this matha. Scholar B. N. K. Sharma says, Majority of Madhvas in Andhra Pradesh, Telangana, northern Karnataka and Maharashtra are followers of Uttaradi Matha. Sharma says in Maharashtra, followers of Uttaradi Math are spread in the districts of Kolhapur, Sholapur, Satara, Pune, Nasik and Ahmednagar. According to Times of India, there are more than 2 lakh followers of Uttaradi Math in Pune city alone. Sharma says all the Thanjavur Marathi Deshastha Brahmins of Madhva Sampradaya, who migrated from Bombay-Karnataka region and Maharashtra to Thanjavur and old Mysore State when Maratha rulers occupied Thanjavur were all followers of Uttaradi Math. Sharma even says Deshastha Madhva Brahmins in former Hyderabad State are all followers of Uttaradi Math.

Mission
The chief mission of the Sri matha is to practice, protect, preach and propagate the ancient Vedic dharma (sanātana dharma''). Since the time of its origin, till date, Uttaradi Math has been and continuing to be the strong advocate of the true Vedic dharma. The Sri Math has extended its services to mankind in all spheres of life like medical care, education, disaster, calamities, wars, etc.

Vidyapeethas and organizations
The Sri Matha has established three to four Vidyapeethas most prominent among them being Sri Jayateertha Vidyapeetha in Bangalore and Sri Satyadhyana Vidyapeetha in Mumbai (Old Hindu Style Gurukuls) with boarding facilities where in students stay and continue their study in Vedas and Madhwa Shastras. Students are rigorously trained here in various branches of knowledge like Grammar, Linguistics, Logic, Mimamsa, Sankhya, Yoga, Veda, Jyotisha, Advaita, Vishistadvaita and Dvaita systems and Modern Philosophies.

Sri Jayateertha Vidyapeetha
Indian Author and Scholar Radhavallabh Tripathi says, "Sri Jayateertha Vidyapeetha was established by Sri Satyapramoda Tīrtha Swamiji in the year 1989, which presently holds more than 200 students and 15 teaching faculty members". The uniqueness of this institution is that its students are specially trained under the guidance of Shri 1008 Shri Satyatma Teertha Swamiji for 12 years with initial 9 years of training at the Jayateertha Vidyapeetha Residential Campus where they attain mastery over Kāvya, Vyākaraṇa, Sahitya, Vedas, Sankhya, Yoga, Jaina, Bauddha, Shakta, Advaita, Vishistadvaita and Dvaita Philosophies under the guidance of Kulapati Guttala Rangacharya, Principal Vidwan Satyadhyanacharya and several other experienced Adhyapakas. During the last 3 years of the course, the students are given extensive classes in Shriman Nyaya Sudha, Tatparya Chandrika, Tarkatandava etc., on tour directly by the learned Swamiji, thus giving the student an opportunity to expand his knowledge base by way of getting exposed, at an early age, to the scholarly world, with the opportunity to meet several esteemed scholars and conducting debates and discussions with them in esteemed centres of learning across the entire country like Kashi, Prayag, Delhi, Pune, Rajahmundry etc. After successfully completing the 12-year course, the students are awarded the title "Sudha Vidwan" in a grand convocation function called the "Sudha Mangala", held at various prime centres of learning. To make themselves eligible for the title the students have to present a paper orally before distinguished scholars and also take an oral exam in Shriman Nyaya Sudha, the magnum opus of Dvaita Philosophy. The candidate is tested for all-round skills and then declared to be eligible for the title by a jury of scholars headed by Satyatma Tirtha.

Sri Satyadhyana Vidyapeetha
Satyadhyana Vidyapeetha was founded in the year 1956 in Matunga, Mumbai by Gopalacharya Ramacharya Mahuli, a disciple of Satyadhyana Tirtha. Satyadhyana Vidyapeetha is an institution of advanced learning. It caters for the needs of scholars interested in higher studies and research. By 1972, It has brought out 26 authoritative volumes on philosophy. Mahuli Vidyasimhacharya is the present Kulapathi of Satyadhyana Vidyapeetha, now located in Mulund, Mumbai.

Vishwa Madhwa Maha Parishat

Satyatma Tirtha Maharaj the present Peetadhipathi of Uttaradi Math founded Vishwa Madhwa Maha Parishat, a non-profit, religious and social organization in 1998. Thousands of books have been published until now under the publication of Vishwa Madhwa Maha Parishat. Every year a 5-day All India Madhwa Convention will be held in Dharwad under the leadership of Satyatma Tirtha Swamiji, Vishwa Madhwa Maha Parishat and Vishwa Madhwa Manahandal, in which the discourses and debates on Nyaya, Tarka, Mimamsa, Dasa literature during which pontiffs of all Madhva Mathas will grace the occasion. Every year Morethan 1 lakh devotees will attend the congregation.

See also
 Satyatma Tirtha
 Dvaita Vedanta
 Dvaita literature

Notes

References

Bibliography

External links
  Official Website of Uttaradi Math  
Satyabodha Swamy Math website

 Uttaradi Math on dvaita.org
Uttaradi Math on YouTube
Sarvajñapīṭha Śrī Uttarādimaṭha guruparaṃpare : Uttarādimaṭhada mūlavr̥ndāvanagaḷa divya darśana / nirdēśana - nirūpaṇe, Śrī Kr̥ṣṇa Kolhārakulakarṇi at Library of Congress

 
Dvaita Vedanta
History of Karnataka
Madhva mathas
Vaishnavism
Hindu monasteries in India